Cauchari Solar Plant is a photovoltaic power station with a total power capacity of 300MW which corresponds to an annual production of approximately 660 GWh. It is located in Cauchari, Jujuy Province. At an attitude of over 4000 meters, it is the highest altitude solar power plant in the world.

Social impacts 
Represents close ties between China & Argentina within the BRI. Furthermore, Argentina's feed-in tariffs for solar projects made it attractive to Chinese investments

Environmental impacts 
Reduces carbon emissions by around 325,000 tonnes.

References

External links 
Interactive scholarly application, multimodal resources mashup (publications, images, videos). Link https://engineeringhistoricalmemory.com/SilkRoad.php?vis=sat&pid=105001&cid=&prac_id=1007

Photovoltaic power stations
Solar power stations in Argentina
Jujuy Province